Danny D. McFarlane, OD (born 14 June 1972) is a Jamaican hurdler, who has won numerous international medals in individual and relay contests. Having won five medals at the World Championships in Athletics and an Olympic bronze medal with the Jamaican 4 x 400 metres team, McFarlane has also won in individual competition: he took an Olympic silver medal in the 400 metres hurdles at the 2004 Athens Olympics.

In the 2009 World Championships in Athletics, he equalled Tim Berrett's record for most appearances at the competition, having competed in every Championships since 1993.

2009

The veteran sprinter gained qualification to the 2009 World Championships in Athletics with a run of 48.54 seconds in the 400 metres hurdles at the Jamaican national championships, taking second behind Isa Phillips.

Personal bests
 400 metres hurdles – 48.00 (2004)
 400 metres – 44.90 (1995)

Major achievements

References

External links
 
 IAAF "Focus on Athletes" article

Jamaican male hurdlers
Jamaican male sprinters
Athletes (track and field) at the 1994 Commonwealth Games
Athletes (track and field) at the 1999 Pan American Games
Athletes (track and field) at the 2000 Summer Olympics
Athletes (track and field) at the 2002 Commonwealth Games
Athletes (track and field) at the 2004 Summer Olympics
Athletes (track and field) at the 2008 Summer Olympics
Olympic athletes of Jamaica
Olympic silver medalists for Jamaica
1972 births
Living people
World Athletics Championships medalists
World record holders in masters athletics
Medalists at the 2004 Summer Olympics
Medalists at the 2000 Summer Olympics
Pan American Games gold medalists for Jamaica
Olympic silver medalists in athletics (track and field)
Pan American Games medalists in athletics (track and field)
Universiade medalists in athletics (track and field)
Goodwill Games medalists in athletics
Universiade bronze medalists for Jamaica
World Athletics Indoor Championships medalists
World Athletics Indoor Championships winners
Medalists at the 1993 Summer Universiade
Competitors at the 2001 Goodwill Games
Medalists at the 1999 Pan American Games
Central American and Caribbean Games medalists in athletics
Commonwealth Games competitors for Jamaica
Goodwill Games gold medalists in athletics